Søren Steen Jespersen is a Danish director, producer and writer best known for producing 2017 documentary Last Men in Aleppo, for which he was co-nominated for Academy Award for Best Documentary Feature.

Jespersen's team was unable to the 90th Academy Awards ceremony, as their visas were rejected in response to President Trump's Executive Order 13780.

Filmography
 Producer
2017: Last Men in Aleppo (Documentary)
2013: The Carbon Crooks (Documentary)
 Director
2018: Lost Warrior (Documentary)
2015: Warriors from the North
Writer
 2015: Warriors from the North (Documentary/story)

Awards and nominations
 90th Academy Awards - Academy Award for Best Documentary Feature
 2017 Sundance Film Festival - World Documentary Grand Jury Prize
 Independent Spirit Award for Best Documentary Feature

See also
 List of Nordic Academy Award winners and nominees

References

External links
 

1962 births
People from Copenhagen
Living people
Danish film producers
Danish male screenwriters